Tale of the Sleeping Giants is a 2021 Finnish nature film directed by . It is about the fells of Sápmi and is the standalone third entry in a series of nature films, after Tale of a Forest (2012) and Tale of a Lake (2016).

Originally set for 2020, Tale of the Sleeping Giants release was postponed due to the COVID-19 pandemic in Finland. Without officially being released it topped Finland's box-office chart solely from preview screenings. The official release took place on 3 December 2021.

Synopsis
Tale of the Sleeping Giants revolves around the fells—barren mountains—of Sápmi in northern Europe. It is about the terrain, wildlife and mythology of the region.

Production

It is the standalone third film in a trilogy about nature and mythology produced by MRP Matila Röhr Productions. By having an element of dramatic storytelling, it differs from the previous films, Tale of a Forest (2012) and Tale of a Lake (2016), which are straight nature documentaries, and it received funding from the Finnish Film Foundation's drama department, not its documentary department.

Filming took place over three years in northern Finland, Norway and Sweden. Production included sustained filming in temperatures as low as minus 42 degrees Celsius. The team recorded 850 hours of footage, which were edited into the 77 minutes of the finished film.

Release
Distribution in Finland is handled by Nordisk Film. The Finnish theatrical release was initially set to 25 December 2020, but was postponed due to the COVID-19 pandemic in Finland. The release took place on 3 December 2021.

Because of the delay, there was time to create subtitles in Northern Sami which will be used during some screenings. A 53 minutes long documentary about the making of Tale of the Sleeping Giants was broadcast on Yle TV1 on 5 April 2021. Without officially being released, due to restrictions imposed on cinema operators, Tale of the Sleeping Giants was able to top the Finnish box-office chart in February 2021 through preview screenings. As of 1 December 2021, it had sold 18,119 tickets in Finland.

Reception
 of Helsingin Sanomat wrote that Tale of the Sleeping Giants follows the formula from the two previous films and it shows that the filmmakers have developed a shared vision, where Virtanen especially complimented the cinematography. Virtanen described Panu Aaltio's soundtrack as powerful and effective in some scenes, but thought other scenes could have gained from not using music.

References

External links
 Distributor's website 
 Production company's website 
 

2021 films
Finnish documentary films
2020s Finnish-language films
Films based on Finno-Ugric mythology
Documentary films about animals
Mountains in fiction
Films postponed due to the COVID-19 pandemic
Films shot in Finland
Films shot in Norway
Films shot in Sweden
Films scored by Panu Aaltio
2021 documentary films